The 1980 Indiana State Sycamores football team was an American football team that represented Indiana State University in the 1980 NCAA Division I-A football season. They were led by first-year head coach Dennis Raetz and played their home games at Memorial Stadium. They were a member of the Missouri Valley Conference (MVC) and finished the season 6–5, 4–2 in MVC play to finish in third place.

The roster included quarterback Reggie Allen, the 1979 MVC Offensive MVP; safety John Allman; and Craig Shaffer the 1981 MVC Defensive MVP. Shaffer spent three seasons with the St. Louis Cardinals.

Allman was the first Sycamore to be named to consecutive all-conference honors. He again received all-conference in 1981 for a third consecutive season, finishing his career second in career tackles (12th today) and third in career interceptions (fourth today). 

Four Sycamores led the MVC in different statistical categories: Kirk Wilson in yards per reception, Joe Stellern in field goals made, Lester Byrd in yardage per kickoff return and John Allman in interception return yardage.

Six Sycamores were named to all-conference teams: Hubert Moore, TE; Eddie Ruffin, WR; Mark Gradkowski, OG; John Gaunt, DT; Craig Shaffer, LB and John Allman, DB

Schedule

References

Indiana State
Indiana State Sycamores football seasons
Indiana State Sycamores football